Gibberula aurelieae is a species of sea snail, a marine gastropod mollusk, in the family Cystiscidae.

Distribution
This species occurs in Martinique.

References

aurelieae
Gastropods described in 2017